17 Again may refer to:
Film
17 Again (film), a 2009 film starring Zac Efron and Matthew Perry
Seventeen Again, a 2000 film starring Tia, Tamera & Tahj Mowry

Music
"17 Again" (song), a 2000 single by Eurythmics
"17 Again" a song by Brantley Gilbert on the album Just As I Am
"17 Again", a song by Tiffany Houghton